Idhaya College for Women, Sarungani, is a general degree college located in Sarungani, Sivaganga district, Tamil Nadu. It was established in the year 1996. The college is affiliated with Alagappa University. This college offers different courses in arts, commerce and science.

Accreditation
The college is  recognized by the University Grants Commission (UGC).

See also
Education in India
Literacy in India
List of educational institutions in Sivagangai district
List of institutions of higher education in Tamil Nadu

References

External links

Educational institutions established in 1996
1996 establishments in Tamil Nadu
Colleges affiliated to Alagappa University